A hybrot (short for "hybrid robot") is a cybernetic organism in the form of a robot controlled by a computer consisting of both electronic and biological elements. The biological elements are typically rat neurons connected to a computer chip.

This feat was first accomplished in 2003 by Dr. Steve M. Potter, a professor of biomedical engineering at the Georgia Institute of Technology:

What separates a hybrot from a cyborg is that the latter term is commonly used to refer to a cybernetically enhanced human or animal; while a hybrot is an entirely new type of creature constructed from organic and artificial materials. It is perhaps helpful to think of the hybrot as "semi-living", a term also used by the hybrot's inventors.

Another interesting feature of the hybrot is its longevity. Neurons separated from a living brain usually die after only a couple of months. However, a specially designed incubator built around a gas-tight culture chamber selectively permeable to carbon dioxide, but impermeable to water vapor, reduces the risk of contamination and evaporation, and may extend the life of the hybrot to one to two years.

See also
Animat
Artificial intelligence
Biorobotics
Brain–computer interface
Neurorobotics
Semi-biotic systems

References

Notes
 
 Shkolnik, A. C. Neurally Controlled Simulated Robot: Applying Cultured Neurons to Handle and Approach/Avoidance Task in Real Time, and a Framework for Studying Learning In Vitro. In: Potter, S. M. & Lu, J.: Dept. of Mathematics and Computer Science. Emory University, Atlanta (2003).

External links
 Georgia Tech Researchers Use Lab Cultures to Control Robotic Device
 Georgia Tech researchers use lab cultures to control robotic device
 A hybrot, the Rat-Brained Robot
 Multielectrode Array Art – A hybrot artist.
 Rise of the rat-brained robots
 FuturePundit: Hybrot Robot Operated By Rat Brain Neurons
 How to Culture, Record and Stimulate Neuronal Networks on Micro-electrode Arrays (MEAs)

Biocybernetics
Cybernetics
-